This article lists the winners and nominees for the NAACP Image Award for Outstanding Directing in a Motion Picture.

Winners and nominees
For each year in the tables below, the winner is listed first and highlighted in bold.

2000s

2010s

2020s

Multiple wins and nominations

Wins
 2 wins
 Gina Prince-Bythewood
 Ryan Coogler

Nominations

 4 nominations
 Spike Lee

 3 nominations
 Malcolm D. Lee
 Tyler Perry
 Gina Prince-Bythewood

 2 nominations
 Kasi Lemmons
 George C. Wolfe
 Tim Story
 Lee Daniels
 F. Gary Gray
 George Tillman, Jr.
 Dee Rees
 Steve McQueen
 Ryan Coogler
 Barry Jenkins
 Reginald Hudlin
 Jordan Peele
 Denzel Washington

External links
 NAACP Image Awards official site

NAACP Image Awards